Silvija Šimfa (born 1954) is a Latvian politician, elected to the twelfth Saeima.

References

1954 births
Living people
21st-century Latvian women politicians
Deputies of the 12th Saeima
Date of birth missing (living people)
Women deputies of the Saeima